Eriodictyon lobbii is a species of flowering plant in the borage family known by the common names Lobb's fiddleleaf and matted yerba santa. It is native to the Sierra Nevada and southern Cascade Range chain in California and adjacent sections of Nevada and Oregon. It grows in high mountain habitat in dry areas on slopes and ridges.

Description
Eriodictyon lobbii is a rhizomatous perennial herb forming dense mats of glandular hairy to woolly herbage usually spreading more than a meter wide. The sticky, hairy oval leaves are up to six centimeters long, occurring alternately along the branching stems and in clusters at stem forks. The funnel-shaped flowers are just under a centimeter wide with five rounded lobes. They are deep pink to purple in color. The plant sends out wide root networks which can grow up to five meters in length per year and sprout new plants.

Uses
The plant Eriodictyon lobbii has been recommended for use as groundcover in revegetation projects in its native mountain ranges.

Taxonomy 
This taxon has been variously treated as Nama lobbii, Conanthus lobbii, and Marilaunidium lobbii. The current treatment of Jepson eFlora regards this plant as Eriodictyon lobbii, based on molecular data provided on the Hydrophylloideae.

References

External links
Jepson Manual Treatment - Nama lobbii'
Photo gallery

lobbii
Flora of the Sierra Nevada (United States)
Flora of the West Coast of the United States
Flora of California
Flora of Nevada
Flora of Oregon
Flora without expected TNC conservation status